Ahaetulla mycterizans, the Malayan green whipsnake or Malayan vine snake, is a slender arboreal snake found in Western Peninsular Malaysia, Java and Sumatra of Indonesia, Singapore, Thailand and possibly Laos up to elevation of 350 m.

Description and ecology
The Malayan green whipsnake is diurnal and mildly venomous. Occurs in primary and mature secondary forests near streams. The diet, like other whip snakes, consists primarily of frogs and lizards. These slow moving snakes often appear like vines amongst foliage and are hard to detect. The anterior part of the body can expand when threatened exposing the dark scales. It is often confused with the oriental whipsnake (Ahaetulla prasina) but the former does not occur in disturbed areas or parks or gardens, especially in its distributional range of Singapore.
The Malayan whipsnake can be distinguished from the oriental whipsnake by the former having larger eyes and the flanks lacking a thin yellow line. The former is also smaller (up to 1 m snout to vent length) as compared to the oriental whipsnake which can grow up to 2 m.

Very little is known about the ecology and natural history of this species.

References 

Ahaetulla
Reptiles of Indonesia
Reptiles of the Malay Peninsula
Reptiles of Singapore
Reptiles of Thailand
Snakes of Southeast Asia
Reptiles described in 1758
Taxa named by Carl Linnaeus